Helensville is a town in the North Island of New Zealand.

The Kaipara River runs through the town and into the Kaipara Harbour to the north.

Early history

The area around Helensville was originally called Te Awaroa, meaning "The long path" or "The long river valley". Most Māori settlements prior to European contact were located along the eastern coast of South Head and along the banks of the Kaipara River. Ōtakanini Pā, located near Parkhurst, was occupied by Māori since at least 1400AD. The pā located around the Kaipara area likely represent some of the earliest fortified pā in Auckland. The Te Taoū hapu of Ngāti Whātua settled the southern Kaipara Harbour and Kaipara River areas. Most Ngāti Whātua retreated from the area in 1825 after the battle of Te Ika a Ranganui in 1825 against Ngāpuhi, returning around 1835. After the signing of the Treaty of Waitangi in the 1840s and 1850s, Ngāti Whātua o Kaipara shipped produce grown from the Kaipara River area and seafood from the Kaipara Harbour to Auckland, and traded kauri wood and gum to settlers.

In 1862 John McLeod established a kauri timber mill on the eastern banks of the Kaipara River, opposite the Te Awaroa village. McLeod named his house "Helen's Villa", after his wife, which became the name for the township that developed around the timber mill. From the 1850s to the 1870s, Ngāti Whātua gifted and sold land to the Crown, hoping this would help stimulate the economy of the area by the creation of European settlements and schools (by 1900, after a process of land alienation, Ngāti Whātua o Kaipara only retained 10% of their traditional rohe). Helensville developed around these blocks of land, growing after the establishment of the North Auckland Line in the 1870s and 1880s. In 1882, the McLeods joined with other investors to create the Helensville Timber Company, who milled forestry around the catchments of the Kaipara River until 1892.

Initial development of Helensville was around the kauri milling industry, but by the start of the 20th century dairying was becoming of increasing importance. It was also becoming somewhat of a tourist centre, owing to the presence of hot springs 3 km to the west of the town at Parakai. A lot of the early history of Helensville is described in the book Men Came Voyaging written by Colleen Sheffield, who lost her life in a bus accident before the book was completed.

Demographics

Helensville had a population of 2,787 at the 2018 New Zealand census, an increase of 144 people (5.4%) since the 2013 census, and an increase of 255 people (10.1%) since the 2006 census. There were 993 households, comprising 1,413 males and 1,377 females, giving a sex ratio of 1.03 males per female. The median age was 36.7 years (compared with 37.4 years nationally), with 642 people (23.0%) aged under 15 years, 507 (18.2%) aged 15 to 29, 1,221 (43.8%) aged 30 to 64, and 417 (15.0%) aged 65 or older.

Ethnicities were 84.6% European/Pākehā, 20.3% Māori, 7.6% Pacific peoples, 4.2% Asian, and 1.3% other ethnicities. People may identify with more than one ethnicity.

The percentage of people born overseas was 17.8, compared with 27.1% nationally.

Although some people chose not to answer the census's question about religious affiliation, 56.3% had no religion, 30.2% were Christian, 2.0% had Māori religious beliefs, 0.9% were Hindu, 0.1% were Muslim, 0.6% were Buddhist and 2.3% had other religions.

Of those at least 15 years old, 330 (15.4%) people had a bachelor's or higher degree, and 435 (20.3%) people had no formal qualifications. The median income was $31,600, compared with $31,800 nationally. 339 people (15.8%) earned over $70,000 compared to 17.2% nationally. The employment status of those at least 15 was that 1,065 (49.7%) people were employed full-time, 327 (15.2%) were part-time, and 87 (4.1%) were unemployed.

Rural surrounds

Helensville Rural had a population of 1,524 at the 2018 New Zealand census, an increase of 189 people (14.2%) since the 2013 census, and an increase of 315 people (26.1%) since the 2006 census. There were 498 households, comprising 771 males and 753 females, giving a sex ratio of 1.02 males per female. The median age was 42.4 years (compared with 37.4 years nationally), with 306 people (20.1%) aged under 15 years, 264 (17.3%) aged 15 to 29, 771 (50.6%) aged 30 to 64, and 183 (12.0%) aged 65 or older.

Ethnicities were 93.7% European/Pākehā, 11.6% Māori, 3.0% Pacific peoples, 2.8% Asian, and 1.4% other ethnicities. People may identify with more than one ethnicity.

The percentage of people born overseas was 21.7, compared with 27.1% nationally.

Although some people chose not to answer the census's question about religious affiliation, 61.6% had no religion, 28.3% were Christian, 0.8% had Māori religious beliefs, 0.2% were Muslim, 0.4% were Buddhist and 2.4% had other religions.

Of those at least 15 years old, 225 (18.5%) people had a bachelor's or higher degree, and 195 (16.0%) people had no formal qualifications. The median income was $40,100, compared with $31,800 nationally. 300 people (24.6%) earned over $70,000 compared to 17.2% nationally. The employment status of those at least 15 was that 672 (55.2%) people were employed full-time, 180 (14.8%) were part-time, and 42 (3.4%) were unemployed.

Government

Local
From 1876 until 1947, Helensville was administered by the Waitemata County, a large rural county north and west of the city of Auckland. In 1947, the area split from the county, forming the Helensville Borough Council. In 1989, the borough merged with Rodney County, to form the Rodney District Council. Rodney District Council was amalgamated into Auckland Council in November 2010.

Within the Auckland Council, Henderson is a part of the Rodney local government area governed by the Rodney Local Board. It is a part of the Rodney ward, which elects one councillor to the Auckland Council.

Mayors during Helensville Borough Council
During the 42-year existence of Helensville Borough Council, it had eight mayors:

National
From 1978 until 2020, Helensville was in the Helensville general electorate. In 2020, this electorate was replaced by the Kaipara ki Mahurangi electorate. Helensville is within the Te Tai Tokerau Māori electorate.

Economy
Formerly a forestry or dairy centre, Helensville is increasingly becoming a dormitory suburb of Auckland with an increasing number of lifestyle blocks in the area. There is some economic benefit from the wine producing region around Kumeū, 20 km to the south.  The principal tourist attraction is the hot springs at nearby Parakai.

Helensville has its own locally produced monthly newspaper, the Helensville News.

The township is in the North West Country Inc business improvement district zone  which represents businesses from Kaukapakapa to Riverhead.

Education
The school began as Helensville District High School in 1924, and changed its name to Kaipara College in 1959.

It was founded in 1877.

Tau Te Arohanoa Akoranga is a satellite campus of the state-integrated Kingsway School, offering a Christian-based education.

All these schools are coeducational.

Transport
Helensville railway station is on the North Auckland Line but the station has been closed since 2009.

With the cessation of the passenger train service the only public transport between Helensville and central Auckland is by buses to and from Westgate in West Auckland then transfer to another bus route 110 to central Auckland. At rush hours an express bus operates to Downtown.

Notable persons

Jim Sheddan (1918–2010), Royal New Zealand Air Force Second World War flying ace

References

External links

Helensville Primary School
Helensville & District Historical Society

Rodney Local Board Area
Populated places in the Auckland Region
Populated places around the Kaipara Harbour
Populated places on the Kaipara River